Numerous synagogues in North America have the name of Temple Israel.

References

  

 
Lists of synagogues
Lists of synagogues in Canada